The Peacocke Baronetcy, of Grange in the County of Limerick and of Barntinck in the County of Clare, was a title in the Baronetage of the United Kingdom. It was created on 24 December 1802 for Sir Joseph Peacocke, of Grange, County Limerick. Sir Joseph was the son of George Peacocke Esq. and his wife Mary (Levett) Peacocke, daughter of Joseph Levett, Alderman, of Cork, Ireland. The title became extinct on the death of his grandson, the third Baronet, in 1876.

Peacocke baronets, of Grange and Barntinck (1802)
Sir Joseph Peacocke, 1st Baronet (died 1812)
Sir Nathaniel Levett Peacocke, 2nd Baronet (1769–1847)
Sir Joseph Francis Peacocke, 3rd Baronet (1805–1876)

Arms

References

External links
The Baronetage of England, John Debrett, 1839
A General and Heraldic Dictionary of the Peerage and Baronetage of the British Empire, John Burke, 1832

Extinct baronetcies in the Baronetage of the United Kingdom